Hazel Dell is an unincorporated area and census-designated place (CDP) in Clark County, Washington, United States, located north and west of Vancouver. As of the 2010 census the population was 19,435. Previous censuses divided the community into two areas, Hazel Dell North and Hazel Dell South.

Geography
Hazel Dell runs parallel to and is bisected by Interstate 5, with access from exits 4 and 5. The community is bounded by the Vancouver city limits on the south in the vicinity of Burnt Bridge Creek, Lake Shore to the west, Salmon Creek to the north, I-205/Barberton to the northeast, and Walnut Grove to the east. Vancouver Lake is a short distance to the west of the area, and the community of Minnehaha is to the southeast.

Much of Hazel Dell is occupied by businesses and working class homes, in well established neighborhoods. The main business portion follows NE Highway 99, just east of I-5, generally, from 63rd to 99th Street, with businesses east and west of Highway 99 on NE 78th and 99th streets. There are fewer businesses and shopping centers along NE Hazel Dell Avenue, just west of I-5, scattered from 63rd to 99th Street. Hazel Dell's businesses and services include several retail, restaurant, and grocery chains, convenience stores, used car dealerships, auto parts stores and auto repair shops, pawn shops, barber shops, taverns, lounges and pubs, and motels, as well as many other franchise eateries, several banks and realty, medical and dental offices.

Municipal services
Law enforcement for the community of Hazel Dell is provided by the Clark County Sheriff's Office, and the local crime rate is typical for a neighborhood of its size and population density. Fire Station 61 on Hazel Dell Avenue operates as part of Clark County Fire District 6 and provides firefighting services to Hazel Dell and neighboring communities. Hazel Dell has its own sewer district as well.

Parks
Construction of Kate and Clarence LaLonde Neighborhood Park was to begin in early July 2010.

Hazel Dell Community Park is located at 2300 NE 68th Street.

Developed in 2007, the Tenny Creek Neighborhood Park is located along NE 88th Street.

Jorgenson Park NW 3rd Ave. / NW 70th St.

Schools
Hazel Dell Elementary School is a kindergarten through 5th grade elementary school located at NE Hazel Dell avenue and Anderson road within the residential area of south Hazel Dell and is part of the Vancouver School District. The school is home to the "Panthers". The current principal is Lisa Reed.
Sacajawea Elementary School is a kindergarten through 5th grade elementary school located within a residential area of northwest Hazel Dell, and is part of the Vancouver School District. The school is home to the "Skyhawks".

Sarah J. Anderson Elementary School is a kindergarten through 5th grade elementary school located within a residential area of northeast Hazel Dell and is part of the Vancouver School District. The school is home to the "Pioneers". The current principal is Katie Arkoosh.

Columbia River High School is a 9th through 12th grade high school located at NW 99th Street within the residential area of Hazel Dell. The school was formerly home to the Chieftains, however, as of 2021, Columbia River High School is now the home of the Rapids.

Toponymy and history
Oregon Country pioneers Reese and Sarah J. Anderson were Hazel Dell's first settlers. Sarah named the area after a stand of filberts on their land near what is today 78th Street and Highway 99. She also donated the land for the first school in Hazel Dell. The name "Bear Gulch" was briefly considered by the early Hazel Dell residents.

Hazel Dell and Minnehaha were two of the first suburban areas to be developed after World War II and were followed by Lake Shore, Felida, and Salmon Creek. Much of the housing boom in this area has subsided due to the increase of homes being built to the east of Vancouver, between Interstate 205 and Camas and Washington State Route 500/Fourth Plain Boulevard and the Columbia River.

Until the early 1970s, it was not uncommon to see horses and dairy cattle at several points along Interstate 5 and Highway 99 where there are now shopping centers. Children during that time often made money for school clothes and summer activities by picking strawberries, raspberries, beans and other vegetables at several farms in the area. After new child labor laws went into effect restricting children under 12 from working, most farm owners implemented "direct to customer" U-pick. There are now only a few small acreage farms left in Hazel Dell and no dairies at all.

Hazel Dell Parade of Bands
Every third Saturday in May since 1964, Hazel Dell has hosted the "Parade of Bands". The parade route follows Hwy 99 North to 78th Street, west to Hazel Dell Avenue, south to 63rd Street and back to Highway 99. The parade was first organized and sponsored by Harvey Johnson and family who owned the now demolished Steakburger Drive-in restaurant on Highway 99.

Basilville renaming proposal
Local business leaders once considered changing the name to "Basilville" in honor of enterprising merchant Basil Dhanens. With thanks, Dhanens declined the offer. He died in 1972.

References

Geography of Vancouver, Washington
Census-designated places in Clark County, Washington
Census-designated places in Washington (state)
Portland metropolitan area.